Shu River is a river of China. It is part of the Yellow Sea basin.

See also
List of rivers in China

Rivers of Shandong
Rivers of Jiangsu